The ShinMaywa US-2 is a large Japanese short takeoff and landing amphibious aircraft that employs boundary layer control technology for enhanced STOL and stall suppression performance. Manufactured by seaplane specialist ShinMaywa (formerly Shin Meiwa), it was developed from the earlier Shin Meiwa  US-1A seaplane, which was introduced during the 1970s.

The ShinMaywa US-2 was developed on behalf of the Japan Maritime Self-Defense Force (JMSDF) as a 'like-for-like' replacement for its aging US-1A fleet.  In Japanese service, it is operated in the air-sea rescue (ASR) role. The US-2 can also be used in other capacities, such as an aerial fire fighter, carrying 15 tonnes of water for this mission. Various overseas operators have held discussions on potential acquisitions of the type, including the Indian Navy and Indian Coast Guard. Other countries such as the United States,  Indonesia, Thailand, and Greece have also shown interest in the US-2 for various purposes.

Design and development
During 1969, the Japan Maritime Self-Defense Force (JMSDF) issued a production order to Japanese seaplane manufacturer Shin Meiwa for a group of 21 anti-submarine aircraft, which were given the designation PS-1. The service had also opted to procure a variant of the type, designated US-1A, specifically for search-and-rescue (SAR). The US-1A was Japan's first amphibian - capable of being used on land and sea.

During the 1990s when the US-1A fleet was beginning to show its age, the JMSDF attempted to obtain funding towards acquiring a replacement, but could not secure enough to develop an entirely new aircraft. Therefore, during 1995, ShinMaywa, as Shin Meiwa had been renamed (reportedly so that the name would be easier to pronounce for non-Japanese speakers) commenced work on a project to develop an upgraded and modernised version of the US-1A, initially referred to as the US-1A kai (US-1A 改 - meaning "improved US-1A"). This modified aircraft features numerous aerodynamic refinements over its predecessor, along with a pressurised hull, and the adoption of more powerful Rolls-Royce AE 2100 engines and electronic cockpit instrumentation. The JMSDF also listed various refinements for the amphibian, including improved handling while landing on water, better onboard patient transfer facilities, and improved search-and-rescue capabilities at sea.

On 18 December 2003, flight testing of the type, which was subsequently designated as the US-2, commenced. During early 2007, ShinMaywa formally launched commercial production of the amphibian. Production is handled by several of Japan's aviation companies. Mitsubishi manufactures the outer wing sections and the rear part of the engine nacelles, while NIPPI Corporation builds the watertight landing gear housings, and Kawasaki Heavy Industries produces the cockpit. Final assembly is performed by ShinMaywa around the US-2's hull. The production line only has the capacity to produce two aircraft at a time. During 2009, the first production US-2, which was outfitted for the search and rescue mission, was delivered to the Japan's Ministry of Defense.

In 2010, ShinMaywa unveiled specifications for a civil fire-fighting variant of its US-2 amphibian. It began marketing the new variant to potential overseas customers that same year. The fire-fighting model replaces one fuel tank with a 15 tonne water tank, reducing its maximum range to 2,300 km (1,245 nm) compared with the SAR's 4,700 km range. The tank is durable enough for salt water, foam and fire retardant. Other features include a pair of water scoops for collecting water, automatic foam mixing equipment and a computer-controlled water drop system.

Operational history

Japan

The JMSDF intends to purchase up to 14 US-2s for its search and rescue needs. The type is currently operated by the 31st Fleet Air Wing (71st Air Force, 71st Flight Squadron) of the JMSDF from both Iwakuni Air Base and Atsugi Air Base. The introduction of the US-2 has enabled the withdrawal of the US-1A, the last of which performed its final flight during December 2017.

During April 2015, aircraft 9905 was involved in an accident. The aircraft was on a training mission near Cape Ashizuri in Shikoku and four crew members were injured. By November 2018, a total of six US-2s had been delivered while a further two aircraft were under production.

Export opportunities
Since the early 2010s, the Indian Navy has an established requirement for between 12 and 18 US-2 amphibians configured as search and rescue aircraft at an anticipated cost of US$1.65 billion. The Indian Coast Guard has also shown interest in procuring three aircraft for its own purposes. It is expected that, if procured, several of these amphibians would be stationed in the Andaman and Nicobar Islands. Indian authorities have reportedly been keen to have the US-2 assembled in India via a licensing arrangement. Performing final assembly of the aircraft locally is expected to cost 25% less than in Japan. Negotiations between the two nations commenced during 2011.

The process of finalising purchase arrangements for the aircraft, which would represent the first sale of military equipment by Japan to India since the Second World War, have been protracted. During October 2016, ShinMaywa announced that it had reduced the offered price to around US$113 million per aircraft. At one point, there were expectations that Japan and India would be signing a contract for the US-2 purchase during November 2016. The decision was deferred by Indian defence minister Manohar Parrikar. During March 2018, Japanese ambassador to India Kenji Hiramatsu informed The Hindu Business Line that talks between the two nations were still in progress. During April 2018, ShinMaywa signed a memorandum of understanding with Indian conglomerate Mahindra Group in support of future Indian sales.

Another prospective customer is Indonesia, which has been reportedly concerned by a growing Chinese military presence across the islands of the South China Sea. It has been speculated that Indonesia could be a key partner in the production of the US-2, potentially competing with India for workshare in the programme. Reportedly, without implementing outsourced production, ShinMaywa is unlikely to be unable to promptly fulfil the needs of a third customer due to its limited production capacity.

There have also been reports that Thailand is interested in purchasing a number of US-2s as maritime patrol aircraft. The nation is reportedly seeking to bolster its surveillance and anti-submarine warfare capabilities while developing deeper defense ties between itself and Japan.

Following a series of deadly fires in the Attica region of Greece circa July 2018, the Greek government reportedly sought to order several US-2s to replace their aging firefighting fleet. If the sale is completed, it would be the first major defense procurement by Greece from a Japanese supplier.

Operators

 Japan Maritime Self Defense Force

Specifications (US-2)

See also

References

Citations

External links

 ShinMaywa US-2 site
 MAST Asia 2015
 US-2 Brochure

US-2
2000s Japanese military rescue aircraft
Post–Cold War military equipment of Japan
Flying boats
Amphibious aircraft
Aerial firefighting aircraft
Four-engined tractor aircraft
High-wing aircraft
Four-engined turboprop aircraft
STOL aircraft
Aircraft first flown in 2003